Betta chini is a species of gourami endemic to the island Borneo where it is only known from the Malaysian state of Sabah. It inhabits very shallow waters (less than ) of peat swamps.

Etymology
The specific name of this fish honours the Malaysian ichthyologist Datuk Chin Phui Kong (1923-ca. 2016).

References

chini
Endemic fauna of Malaysia
Freshwater fish of East Malaysia
Taxa named by Ng Peter Kee Lin
Fish described in 1993
Taxonomy articles created by Polbot